Rock Therapy was a 1996 one-off project consisting of Queen guitarist Brian May, Rolling Stones drummer Charlie Watts, plus a number of guest vocalists including Sam Brown, Andy Fairweather Low, Paul Rodgers and Lulu. This was a 3-track charity CD issued in aid of the Nordoff-Robbins Music Therapy Centre, which helps special needs children to communicate through the medium of music.

The song "Reaching Out" peaked at number 126 on the UK charts. Queen + Paul Rodgers performed the song live during their 2005–2006 tour, and released three recordings: one on their 2005 double live album Return of the Champions (also issued on the single "Reaching Out/Tie Your Mother Down"), and two as download-only tracks. The live version was sampled in 2009 by Eminem for the track "Beautiful" from his album Relapse.

Track listing 
 "Reaching Out"
 "Reaching Out (Acoustic)"
 "Reaching Out (Instrumental)"

References

British supergroups
Charity supergroups